Pavilhão do Tafe is an indoor sporting arena located in Cabinda, Angola. The arena, built on the occasion of the 2007 Afrobasket, alongside the Pavilhão Acácias Rubras in Benguela, Pavilhão N.Sra do Monte in Huíla and the Pavilhão Serra Van-Dúnem in Huambo, has a 2,000-seat capacity.

See also
 Pavilhão Acácias Rubras
 Pavilhão N.Sra do Monte
 Pavilhão Serra Van-Dúnem

References

Cabinda
Cabinda Province
Basketball venues in Angola